The 1940–41 Taça de Portugal was the third season of the Taça de Portugal (English: Portuguese Cup), the premier Portuguese football knockout competition, organized by the Portuguese Football Federation (FPF). Benfica was the defending champion but lost in the semi-finals to Belenenses. The final was played on 22 June 1941 between Sporting Clube de Portugal and Clube de Futebol Os Belenenses.

Participating Teams

Primeira Divisão 
(8 Teams)
Associação Académica de Coimbra – Organismo Autónomo de Futebol
Futebol Clube Barreirense
Clube de Futebol Os Belenenses
Sport Lisboa e Benfica
Boavista Futebol Clube
Futebol Clube do Porto
Sporting Clube de Portugal
Clube de Futebol Os Unidos "de Lisboa"

Segunda Divisão 
(6 Teams)
Leça Futebol Clube
Sporting Clube Olhanense
Operário Futebol Clube de Lisboa
Seixal Futebol Clube
Sporting Clube da Covilhã
Vitória Sport Clube "de Guimarães"

Madeira Championship 
(1 Team)
Clube de Futebol União "da Madeira"

First round
In this round entered the teams from Primeira Divisão (1st level) and Segunda Divisão (2nd level).

Results

|}

Quarterfinals
In this round entered the winner from Madeira Championship and the winners of the previous round.

Results

|}

Semifinals

Results

|}

Semifinal play-off

Final

References

External links
Official webpage 
1940–41 Taça de Portugal at zerozero.pt 

Taça de Portugal seasons
Port
Taca